Nagra is a town located in Jhansi Nagar Nigam in the state of Uttar Pradesh in India. It is part of Bundelkhand geographic region and the preferred dialect here is Bundelkhandi. Main population of Nagra consists of railway employees and daily wage earning community.

Geography
It has an average elevation of 210 metres (692 feet).

Education
Most of the schools are affiliated to UP board.

Schools

 Saint Umar Inter College, Jhansi
 Dr. B. R. Ambedkar Science Inter College
 Janak Inter College
 Don Bosco College
 M. S. Rajput Inter College
 St. Jude's Inter College
 Kastorba Kanya Inter College

Colleges
 Swami Vivekanand College
 Hari Singh Degree College

Facilities and communication

Transport
Main modes of transport are autos and private cabs. The nearest station available is Jhansi railway station. The town is well connected by Shivpuri highway and Lalitpur highway.

Factories and workshops

 Railway Workshop
 Railway Coach Factory

Police stations
Nagra (Premnagar) is the nearest police station. Apart from this there are many general railway police (GRP) police stations as this area mainly consists of Railway property.

Cinema
 Bhusan Cinema Hall

References

Cities and towns in Jhansi district